Kendriya Vidyalaya (AFS) is located inside the, 6 - Wing Air Force Station, Palta, Barrackpore.

History
The school was inaugurated on 15 December 1964. The first principal was S.P. Bhattacharya and the first chairman was Dr. D.M. Oka. It was then known as "Central School" and for the next few decades, it was only for the wards of the central government employees only. In the 1980s it was opened for all.

Education system
Kendriya Vidyalaya (AFS) runs as per the norms of CBSE and Kendriya Vidyalaya Sangathan. The school has three divisions which are Primary (I - V), Junior Secondary (VI - VIII), and Senior Secondary (IX-XII). Each class are further divided into four sections. The school offers three streams, Humanities, Science (Computer Science / Biological Science) and Commerce at 10+2 level.

Academic session 
The academic session starts from 1 April and ends on 31 March of every financial year.

References 

Kendriya Vidyalayas
Primary schools in West Bengal
High schools and secondary schools in West Bengal
Schools in North 24 Parganas district
Educational institutions established in 1964
1964 establishments in West Bengal